Sorbonne Paris Cité Alliance (Alliance Sorbonne Paris Cité) is a university alliance since 2019 and a former association of universities and higher education institutions (ComUE) for institutions of higher education and research in the city of Paris and the French department of Seine-Saint-Denis.

The university was organized as a ComUE according to the 2013 Law on Higher Education and Research (France), effective December 30, 2014. The ComUE succeeded a similar association that had previously been effect for a few years as a Pôle de recherche et d'enseignement supérieur (PRES) with the same name, "Sorbonne Paris Cité" .

Members 
Sorbonne Paris Cité brings together the following institutions:

 Paris Cité University
 University of Sorbonne Paris-Nord
École des hautes études en santé publique (EHESP)
 Sciences Po
 Institut national des langues et civilisations orientales (Langues O)
 Institut de Physique du Globe de Paris
 Centre national de la recherche scientifique (CNRS)
 Institut national d'études démographiques (INED)
 Institut national de recherche en informatique et en automatique (INRIA)
 Institut national de la santé et de la recherche médicale (INSERM)
 Institut de recherche pour le développement (IRED)

References

External links 
 Sorbonne Paris Cité website

Universities in France